Nieledwia  is a village in the administrative district of Gmina Milówka, within Żywiec County, Silesian Voivodeship, in southern Poland.

The village has a population of 1,046.

References

Villages in Żywiec County